Tubaria rufofulva is a species of agaric fungus in the family Tubariaceae. Found in Australia, it was originally described in 1927 by John Burton Cleland as a species of Pholiota. The fungus was transferred to the genus Tubaria in 1983.

References

External links

Tubariaceae
Fungi described in 1927
Fungi of Australia
Taxa named by John Burton Cleland